Isom is an unincorporated community in Dickenson County, Virginia, in the United States.

History
A post office was established at Isom in 1905, and remained in operation until it was discontinued in 1959. The community was named for Isom Mullins, a pioneer.

References

Unincorporated communities in Dickenson County, Virginia
Unincorporated communities in Virginia